Lebediny (masculine), Lebedinaya (feminine), or Lebedinoye (neuter) is the name of several inhabited localities in Russia.

Urban localities
Lebediny, Sakha Republic, a settlement in Aldansky District of the Sakha Republic

Rural localities
Lebediny, Altai Krai, a settlement in Urozhayny Selsoviet of Sovetsky District of Altai Krai
Lebedinoye, Chelyabinsk Oblast, a selo in Parizhsky Selsoviet of Nagaybaksky District of Chelyabinsk Oblast
Lebedinoye, Khasansky District, a selo in Khasansky District of Primorsky Krai
Lebedinoye, Spassky District, a selo in Spassky District of Primorsky Krai